In film, a sequence is a series of scenes that form a distinct narrative unit, which is usually connected either by a unity of location or a unity of time. For example, a heist film might include an extended recruitment sequence in which the leader of the gang collects together the conspirators, a robbery sequence, an escape sequence, and so on. Each of these sequences might further contain sub-sequences; for example the robbery sequence might consist of an entry sequence, a safe-cracking sequence, and so on.

The sequence is one of a hierarchy of structural units used to describe the structure of films in varying degrees of granularity. Analysed this way, a film is composed of one or more acts; acts include one or more sequences; sequences are divided into one or more scenes; and scenes may be thought of as being built out of shots (if one is thinking visually) or beats (if one is thinking in narrative terms).

The sequence paradigm of screenwriting was developed by Frank Daniel.

See also 
 Act structure
 Sequential art

Film scenes
Film and video terminology
Sequences in time